MBus or M-Bus may refer to:

 MBus (SPARC), a computer bus designed for communication between high speed system components
 M-Bus, or Meter-Bus, a bus used for remote reading of gas or electricity meters (EN 13757)
 Message Bus (Mbus), an inter-process communication protocol (RFC 3259)
 Master of Business, a college degree

See also
 Modbus